Steshenko is a Ukrainian surname. Notable people with the surname include:

 Aida Steshenko (born 1968), Turkmenistan table tennis player
 Ivan Steshenko (1873–1918), Ukrainian activist and writer

See also
 

Ukrainian-language surnames